Church End is a hamlet in the civil parish of Shalford, and the Braintree district of Essex, England.

References

Hamlets in Essex
Braintree District